Claudio Michel Stecchi (born 23 November 1991) is an Italian pole vaulter. He competed at the 2020 Summer Olympics, in Pole vault.

Biography
He is the son of the former Italian pole vaulter Gianni Stecchi (born 1958). His personal best is 5.82 m (indoor, 2023). He won six times the national championship. His assistant coach is the Italian former pole vaulter World champion, Giuseppe Gibilisco.

Jumps over 5.70 m in 2019

Personal bests
Outdoor
Pole vault: 5.82 m ( Chiari, 8 September 2020)
Indoor
Pole vault: 5.80 m ( Clermont-Ferrand, 24 February 2019)

Progression

Outdoor

Indoor

Achievements

National titles
 Italian Athletics Championships
 Pole vault: 2012, 2013, 2015, 2018
 Italian Indoor Athletics Championships
 Pole vault: 2012, 2018

See also
 Italian all-time lists - Pole vault

Notes

References

External links
 

1991 births
Living people
People from Bagno a Ripoli
Italian male pole vaulters
World Athletics Championships athletes for Italy
Universiade medalists in athletics (track and field)
Universiade bronze medalists for Italy
Athletics competitors of Fiamme Gialle
Medalists at the 2017 Summer Universiade
Athletes (track and field) at the 2020 Summer Olympics
Olympic athletes of Italy
Sportspeople from the Metropolitan City of Florence